Year 993 (CMXCIII) was a common year starting on Sunday (link will display the full calendar) of the Julian calendar.

Events 
 By place 

 Europe 
 Spring – The 12-year-old King Otto III gives the Sword of Saints Cosmas and Damian (also known as the Sword of Essen) as a gift to the convent in Essen. It symbolises the martyrdom of Cosmas and Damian, the patron saints of the city.
 Charles, duke of Lower Lorraine, dies in prison in Orléans (see 991). He is succeeded by his son Otto II, who inherits the full dukedom and pledges his allegiance to Otto III.

 By topic 

 Religion 
 July 4 – Pope John XV issues a decree canonizing the late Bishop Ulrich of Augsburg, the first recorded canonization of a saint.

 Astronomy 

Births 
 Majd al-Dawla, Buyid emir of Rayy (d. 1029)
 Samuel ibn Naghrillah, Spanish Talmudic scholar
 Sultan al-Dawla, Buyid emir of Fars (d. 1024)

Deaths 
 March 13 – Odo I, German nobleman
 October 19 – Conrad I, king of Burgundy
 December 9 – Egbert, archbishop of Trier
 Arnulf (or Aernout), count of Friesland
 Borrell II, count of Barcelona and Urgell
 Charles, duke of Lower Lorraine (b. 953)
 David II, prince of Tao-Klarjeti (Georgia)
 Landenulf II, Lombard prince of Capua
 Maelcairearda, king of Uí Briúin (Ireland)
 Minamoto no Masanobu, Japanese nobleman (b. 920) 
 William I, French nobleman (b. 950)

References